John Masiarcyzk Sr. is the former and inaugural mayor of the city of Deltona, Florida.

Early life
Masiarcyzk was born in Detroit, Michigan. He enlisted in the United States Navy after graduating from high school and served during the Vietnam War era, and later was stationed at Naval Air Station Sanford in Sanford, Florida. When he completed his Naval Service, he later retired from the US Navy and moved to Deltona, Florida.

Political career
In 1995, Masiarcyzk ran to become the mayor of the city of Deltona, serving from November 7, 1995, until November 8, 2005. He ran against Roberto "Bob" Garcia in the general election that year. Masiarcyzk was ineligible to run for re-election in 2005 due to term limits. In 2005 Dennis Mulder declared his candidacy to succeed Masiarcyzk as mayor and later won that year defeating City Commissioner Doug Horn. In 2010, Masiarcyzk won election again to replace the incumbent mayor Dennis Mulder who resigned from office not seeking re-election. He ran against then Commissioner/Vice Mayor David Santiago in the general election. Masiarcyzk won re-election again as mayor defeating his challenger, Zenaida Denizac, who was a commissioner of the city in the year of 2014. Due to term limits, Masiarcyzk was once again ineligible to run for re-election in 2018 for having served two consecutive terms in office since his return to the mayoral office in 2010. He was succeeded in office by Heidi Herzberg.

References

External links
 

1950 births
Living people
Mayors of places in Florida
Mayors of Deltona, Florida
Military personnel from Florida
People from Deltona, Florida
United States Navy sailors